The 1957 Stanley Cup Finals was the championship series of the National Hockey League's (NHL) 1956–57 season, and the culmination of the 1957 Stanley Cup playoffs. It was contested between the defending champion Montreal Canadiens and the Boston Bruins. The Canadiens were making their seventh consecutive Final appearance, while Boston was making their first appearance since their  loss to Montreal. The Canadiens won the series, four games to one, for their second straight Cup victory.

Paths to the Finals
Montreal defeated the New York Rangers 4–1 to reach the final. Boston defeated the Detroit Red Wings 4–1 to reach the final.

Game summaries
Jacques Plante held the Bruins to just six goals in the five games, four of which were scored by Fleming Mackell.

Stanley Cup engraving
The 1957 Stanley Cup was presented to Canadiens captain Maurice Richard by NHL President Clarence Campbell following the Canadiens 5–1 win over the Bruins in game five.

The following Canadiens players and staff had their names engraved on the Stanley Cup

1956–57 Montreal Canadiens

See also
 1956–57 NHL season

Notes

References

 Podnieks, Andrew; Hockey Hall of Fame (2004). Lord Stanley's Cup. Bolton, Ont.: Fenn Pub. pp 12, 50. 

Stanley Cup
Stanley Cup Finals
Boston Bruins games
Montreal Canadiens games
Ice hockey competitions in Montreal
Stanley Cup Finals
1950s in Montreal
1957 in Quebec
Ice hockey competitions in Boston
Stanley Cup Finals
1950s in Boston